38 may refer to:
38 (number), the natural number following 37 and preceding 39
one of the years 38 BC, AD 38, 1938, 2038
.38, a caliber of firearms and cartridges
.38 Special, a revolver cartridge
Thirty-Eight: The Hurricane That Transformed New England, a 2016 book by Stephen Long
"Thirty Eight", a song by Karma to Burn from the album Almost Heathen, 2001